Andrew Klippel is an Australian music producer, songwriter and engineer. Klippel co-founded Australian dance-pop group Euphoria (1991-1993), before releasing solo music under the alias Elastic (1994) and A.K. Soul (1995+)

Early life
Andrew Klippel is the son of sculptor and teacher, Robert Klippel. Andrew spent some years in the UK, before returning to Australia. 

By the late 1980s, Andrew began playing live with his own small bands around Sydney, including Andrew Klippel and Electric Soul. In the early 1990s, Andrew formed a songwriting/production company called ESP with Melbourne DJ Ean Sugarman.

Career

1991–1993: Euphoria

In 1991, Klippel co-founded Australian dance-pop trio Euphoria with Holly Garnett and Keren Minshull and in October 1991, released their debut single "Love You Right" which peaked at number 1 on the ARIA Charts. In April 1992, the trio released "One in a Million" which also peaked at number 1 on the ARIA Charts. The trio released the album, Total Euphoria in October 1992, which peaked at number 14 on the ARIA Charts. The group disbanded in 1993.

1994: Elastic 
In 1994, Klippel released a solo single under the name Elastic. "Caution to the Wind" peaked at number 61 on the ARIA charts.

1995–1996: A.K. Soul
In 1995, Klippel released solo material under the alias A.K. Soul. Debut single "I Like It" was released in June 1995 and peaked at number 28 on the ARIA Charts. This was followed in 1996 by single "Show You Love" and album, Free.

1996–present: Writer and producer
Since 1996, Klippel has become an in-demand writer and producer. Klippel worked closely with Human Nature and then went on to form Engine Room, the home of The Vines, The Veronicas, Lash and Holly Valance.

Discography

Studio albums

Singles

Awards and nominations

APRA Awards
The APRA Awards are held in Australia and New Zealand by the Australasian Performing Right Association to recognise songwriting skills, sales and airplay performance by its members annually

! 
|-
| 2022
| "The Other Black Dog" by Genesis Owusu (Genesis Owusu, Michael Di Francesco, Andrew Klippel, Julian Sudek)
| Song of the Year
| 
|
|-

ARIA Music Awards
The ARIA Music Awards is an annual awards ceremony that recognises excellence, innovation, and achievement across all genres of Australian music. They commenced in 1987. 

! 
|-
| 2021
| Andrew Klippel, Dave Hammer for Genesis Owusu – Smiling with No Teeth
| ARIA Award for Producer of the Year
| 
|

References

20th-century Australian male singers
Year of birth missing (living people)
Living people